Ehsanullah Reki is a Pakistani politician who has been a member of the National Assembly of Pakistan since August 2018.

Political career
He was elected to the National Assembly of Pakistan from Constituency NA-270 (Panjgur-cum-Washuk-cum-Awaran) as a candidate of Balochistan Awami Party in 2018 Pakistani general election.

References

Living people
Pakistani MNAs 2018–2023
Balochistan Awami Party MNAs
Year of birth missing (living people)